Augustasaurus is a genus of aquatic sauropterygian reptile belonging to the Pistosauria, a clade containing plesiosaurs and their close relatives. Pistosaurus and Augustasaurus were thought to be the only known members of the family Pistosauridae. However, some recent cladistic analyses found Augustasaurus to be a more advanced pistosaur, as a sister group of the order Plesiosauria. The only known species of Augustasaurus is Augustasaurus hagdorni, which was first described in 1997.

Etymology
The first part of Augustasaurus''' name comes from the Augusta Mountains of northwestern Nevada, USA, where its fossil bones were first discovered. The second part of the name is the Greek word , which means "lizard" or "reptile." The type species, Augustasaurus hagdorni, was named in honor of the paleontologist Hans Hagdorn.

Its skull shares many general characteristics with its relative, Pistosaurus, such as tall, blade-like upper temporal arches. The skull's elongated rostrum tapers to a dull point, the anterior premaxillary and maxillary teeth have been described as "fang-like", and the squamosal makes a box-like suspensorium.

The dorsal neural spines of Augustasaurus are low with rugose tops. Its coracoids are large plates similar to those in other plesiosaurs. However, the coracoid foramen are missing from Agustasaurus, in a way similar to those in the pistosauroid Corosaurus. Its cervical ribs have anterior process, and like most plesiosaurs, Augustasaurus' vertebrae have "thickened transverse processes".

DistributionAugustasaurus'' is known from the Augusta Mountains of northwestern Nevada (United States). The holotype specimen was found in the Favret Formation, which dates from the mid-Triassic period, of Pershing County, Nevada.

See also
 Timeline of plesiosaur research

References

External links
https://web.archive.org/web/20081120014242/http://www.vertpaleo.org/publications/jvp/22-577-592.cfm
https://web.archive.org/web/20071210085257/http://www.plesiosaur.com/database/genusIndividual.php?i=32
https://web.archive.org/web/20081005203917/http://www.palaeos.com/Vertebrates/Units/220Lepidosauromorpha/220.400.html

Triassic sauropterygians
Fossil taxa described in 1997
Middle Triassic reptiles of North America
Pistosaurs
Aquatic reptiles
Sauropterygian genera